José Ramón Uriarte (born 21 January 1967) is a Spanish former professional racing cyclist. He rode in five editions of the Tour de France, three editions of the Giro d'Italia and five editions of the Vuelta a España.

Major results

1992
10th Subida a Urkiola
1993
1st Trofeo Luis Ocaña
3rd Trofeo Forla de Navarra
1994
1st Stage 4 Vuelta a Mallorca
1st Stage 4 Vuelta a los Valles Mineros
3rd Trofeo Forla de Navarra
8th Subida a Urkiola
1996
10th Overall Volta ao Alentejo
1997
1st Stage 4b Troféu Joaquim Agostinho
1st Subida a Txitxarro
8th Overall Vuelta a los Valles Mineros
1998
10th Subida a Urkiola

Grand Tour general classification results timeline

References

External links
 

1967 births
Living people
Spanish male cyclists
People from Arratia-Nerbioi
Sportspeople from Biscay
Cyclists from the Basque Country (autonomous community)